WHW may refer to:

 Werkstätte Hagenauer Wien (wHw), a family business in Vienna
 While Heaven Wept (often abbreviated as WHW), a doom metal band
 Das Winterhilfswerk des Deutschen Volkes, commonly known as Winterhilfswerk or WHW, a Nazi social welfare effort